Henrik Westman (1 October 1940 – 15 August 2019) was a Swedish politician from Stockholm County who served in the Riksdag from 1998 to 2006 as a member of the Moderate Party.

References

1940 births
2019 deaths
Members of the Riksdag from the Moderate Party
Members of the Riksdag 1998–2002
Members of the Riksdag 2002–2006
20th-century Swedish politicians
21st-century Swedish politicians